Uluwatu is a region on the south-western tip of the Bukit Peninsula of Bali, Indonesia. It is home to the Pura Luhur Uluwatu Temple.

The name Uluwatu comes from ulu, meaning 'lands end', and watu, meaning 'rock'.

Geography 

Visible in the Bukit Peninsula are layers of tertiary limestone resulting from the tectonic subduction of the Indo-Australian Plate under the Eurasian Plate, bringing it above sea level. Uluwatu borders the Indian Ocean to the south.

Surfing 

Uluwatu was "discovered" as a surfing destination in 1972, due to the making of Morning of the Earth, a 1971 classic surf film by Alby Falzon and David Elfick. The original goal of the film was to show waves around Kuta. After a few days of shooting around Kuta beach, they found Uluwatu. To get to Uluwatu requires descending down the temple and emerging through the two rocks at the base of the cave, at the beach of Uluwatu. At the time, there were no roads leading to the beach, which meant that surfers had to bring all the supplies they would need. Steve Cooney surfed the first wave in Uluwatu history, capturing it on film for Morning of the Earth at age 15. After the film's release on 25 February 1972, Uluwatu received immediate attention from surfers across the globe.  Today Uluwatu is one of the most popular surf destinations in all of Bali, with surfers visiting from all over the world and with the advancement in video technology there has been some incredible aerial footage showcasing Uluwatu's beauty from the air.

Wave breaks 

Starting from the top of the series of wave breaks to the bottom, the wave is composed of five breaks: The Bombie, Temples, Outside Corner, Racetracks, and The Peak.

Bombie 
Bombie is the first of the five breaks in the Uluwatu series, located on the outer reef. Well known for breaking boards and snapping leashes, Bombie is an extremely powerful wave. On bigger swell days the wave can reach up to 20 feet. With fairly consistent surf year round, the best time is from May to October. This is the dry season with southeast winds. The typical surf arises from groundswells, coming in with a southwest swell direction. Bombie has a left breaking reef.

Temples 
Temples received its name from an old temple on the foreground of the cliff. It is the second wave break in the series. This wave is recognized by the heavy amount of swell it receives. It is not a highly populated wave by surfers because it takes more effort to get out to it. However, there is a strong crew of expat and local surfers there and proper etiquette is required at all time.

Outside Corner 
Next in line is Outside Corner, making this the other outer reef portion of Uluwatu. Outside Corner is next in line to The Peak and Racetracks, connecting them as swells pick up. During low tide, experiencing breaks can be expected on the biggest swells, but not before reaching . Some of the waves during this time will build up, reaching .

Racetracks 
Racetracks makes for an incredibly fast ride. Low tide is its prime time. During low tide, large barrels form at the end of the ride. The water is extremely shallow here making it something to be cautious of. Beware of the reef at the end of the ride, Racetracks is known to dry dock there, making it a high concern for surfers, and very dangerous. Mid tide is another great time for surfing. Unlike low tide, during mid tide, the barrels are more navigable, and it is more likely to reach the end of the ride with success.

The Peak 
Last in the series of break, The Peak is found. It is located right at the base of the cave, making this the entry and exit point of Uluwatu. The Peak operates well at every tide stage. Coming in best at high tide this wave makes for many hollow barreling waves. Unlike high tide, low tide at The Peak is known for closing out. The Peak has a reef break. Winds from the southeast make the most ideal waves. It is key to have a board the size of 6’8-7’4 while surfing this wave.

Swells 

Due to deep-water channels on both sides of the Bukit Peninsula, swells are mainly found there. Strong currents make for larger swells at low tide. During these lower tides and large swells, The Peak, Racetracks, and Temples are all under white water, and Bombie and Outside Corner take the swells, creating  waves. At high tide, small swells will be more prevalent, creating barrels.

Transportation 
The closest airport to Uluwatu is Ngurah Rai International Airport in Denpasar. There are 41 airlines that depart out of the airport, and the airport offers nonstop flights to 50 cities every week. There is a minimum of 966 domestic flights and 889 international flights per week departing from it.

Surfers blessings 

The Pura Luhur Uluwatu temple is one of nine directional temples of Bali, found  up at the top of the rock at the southwest most point of the peninsula. Locals on the island believe that Gods have blessed the surfers who surf the Uluwatu wave, because of how divine and perfect the waves there are. The temple is believed to protect Bali against evil.

References 

Articles containing video clips
Tourist attractions in Bali
Populated places in Bali
Beaches of Indonesia
Surfing locations in Indonesia
Badung Regency